The MALOVA (MALignant OVArian cancer) study is a multidisciplinary Danish study of ovarian cancer and encompasses epidemiology, lifestyle factors, biochemistry, and molecular biology with the purpose of identifying risk factors and prognostic factors for ovarian cancer.

External links
Aspirin May Decrease Risk of Aggressive Form of Ovarian Cancer
Aspirin Lowers Aggressive Form of Ovarian Cancer

Danish medical research
Gynaecology
Cancer research
Epidemiological study projects
Ovarian cancer